Risalpur Cantonment is a cantonment adjacent to the Risalpur in Nowshera District, Khyber Pakhtunkhwa, Pakistan.

Cantonments of Pakistan